Lady Sunhwa, Royal Consort Won of the Namyang Hong clan (Hangul: 순화원비 남양 홍씨, Hanja: 順和院妃 南陽 洪氏, lit. Primary Consort Sunhwa of the Namyang Hong clan; d. 21 September 1306) was the fourth wife of King Chungseon of Goryeo. They had no children. She was also the older sister of Queen Gongwon, who would later become the consort of King Chungsuk, Lady Sunhwa's step-son, and the mother of two successive Kings, Chunghye and Gongmin.

References

 
Royal Consort Sunhwa on Encykorea .

13th-century births
1306 deaths
Consorts of Chungseon of Goryeo
14th-century Korean women
13th-century Korean women